Shane Guthrie (born 11 December 1984) is an Irish footballer who plays for Kerry in the League of Ireland First Division. He has played Gaelic football with Kerry and Munster club champions and All-Ireland semi-finalists Austin Stacks.

Career
Guthrie was born in Donegal, Ireland. He played youth football in County Kerry with St Brendans Park, Kingdom Boys and Tralee Dynamos.

Guthrie signed for Cork City in 2003 having previously played for Kingdom Boys and Tralee Dynamos in Kerry. Shane made his senior team bow in the 2004 Munster Senior Cup.

Guthrie signed for Shamrock Rovers on loan in July 2006 and made a scoring debut at Cobh Ramblers on 15 July. Gutherie scored again against Kildare County before breaking his leg against Athlone Town thus ending his short Rovers career.

Guthrie signed for Cobh Ramblers in early 2007 and spent two seasons at the club making 59 appearances.

Shane then moved to Galway United for the 2009 season where he had a very impressive season making 31 appearances for the Tribesmen.

In 2023, Guthrie joined new League of Ireland First Division club Kerry F.C., for which his brother Wayne had previously signed.

Gaelic football
Shane was among the substitutes for Austin Stacks during their All-Ireland club Gaelic football semi final against Slaughtneil in 2015.

Honours
St Patrick's Athletic
 Leinster Senior Cup (1): 2010-11

Limerick
 League of Ireland First Division (1): 2012
 Munster Senior Cup (1): 2011-12

References

1984 births
Living people
Republic of Ireland association footballers
Association football defenders
League of Ireland players
Cork City F.C. players
Kilkenny City A.F.C. players
Shamrock Rovers F.C. players
Cobh Ramblers F.C. players
Galway United F.C. (1937–2011) players
St Patrick's Athletic F.C. players
Dundalk F.C. players
Limerick F.C. players
Republic of Ireland under-23 international footballers
Tralee Dynamos A.F.C. players
Austin Stacks Gaelic footballers
Gaelic footballers who switched code
Association footballers from County Donegal